"News and Newspaper Summary" (Pinyin: Xīnwén hé Bàozhǐ Zhāiyào, IPA pronunciation:) the China National Radio's daily morning news programme, also the station's oldest, most influential, highest standing broadcasts. Having a greater influence in mainland China. According to the official introduction of the China National Radio, listeners, the program always ranked list of all programs all stations, has a broad, long-term and fixed audiences. It is usually broadcast live over CNR News Radio and CNR Countryside Radio from Beijing Time 6:30-7:00 a.m. every day. It also simulcasts on the flagship services of the local radio stations in China. The programme reruns on CNR Business Radio at 7:00 am every day.

History 
 April 10, 1950, the first prototype of "News and Newspapers Summary" program "Capital Newspaper Summary" (Pinyin: shǒudū bàozhǐ zhāiyào, IPA pronunciation ) program launched. 
 In 1954, the "Ode to the Motherland" as the start music. 
 April 4, 1955, "The Central Newspapers Summary" (Pinyin: zhōngyāng bàozhǐ zhāiyào, IPA pronunciation ) the name of the launch. 
 July 4, 1955, "The Central Newspaper Summary" program was renamed "News and Newspapers Summary" .
 November 1, 2008, "News and Newspapers Summary" program successful way to live broadcast (live briefly in 1981 before).

News anchors 
Yu Fang, Zhong Cheng, Fang Liang, Zheng Lan, Wei Dong, Chen Liang, Zhi Peng, Wang Yi, Wan Ying

Ident 
The theme music of News and Newspapers Summary is Ode to the Motherland, a well-known Chinese patriotic song, with an announcer's voice "(This is) China National Radio, now it's the time for News and Newspapers Summary ( and IPA Pronunciation:,).

Chinese radio programs